Hüseyin Tok (born 9 September 1988) is a Turkish professional footballer who plays as a center back for Manisa Sanayispor. Tok is also a youth international, having been capped at the U-17, U-19, and U-21 levels.

Life and career
Tok was born in Sakarya, Turkey. He began his footballing career with local club Sakaryaspor in 2002. Tok make his professional debut during the 2006-07 season. In 2008, he was transferred to Manisaspor.

Tok joined Manisa Sanayispor ahead of the 2019/20 season.

International career
Tok has been capped at the U-17, U-19, and U-21 levels.

References

External links
 
 

1988 births
Living people
Sakaryaspor footballers
Manisaspor footballers
Turkish footballers
Turkey under-21 international footballers
Süper Lig players
İstanbul Başakşehir F.K. players
Turkey youth international footballers
TFF First League players
Balıkesirspor footballers
Association football defenders